Elections to Amber Valley Borough Council were held on 3 May 2007.  One third of the council was up for election and the Conservative Party held overall control of the council.  Overall turnout was 37.7%.

After the election, the composition of the council was:
Conservative 28
Labour 17

Election result

1 Conservative candidate was unopposed.

Ward results

External links
BBC report of 2007 Amber Valley election result

2007
2007 English local elections
2000s in Derbyshire